A swimsuit is an item of clothing designed to be worn by people engaging in a water-based activity or water sports, such as swimming, diving and surfing, or sun-orientated activities, such as sun bathing. Different types may be worn by men, women, and children. A swimsuit can be described by various names, some of which are used only in particular locations, including swimwear, bathing suit, swimming costume, bathing costume, swimming suit, swimmers, swimming togs, bathers, cossie (short for "costume"), or swimming trunks for men, besides others.

A swimsuit can be worn as an undergarment in sports that sometimes require a wetsuit or drysuit such as cold water swimming, water skiing, scuba diving, surfing, and wakeboarding. Swimsuits may also be worn to display the wearer's physical attributes, as in the case of beauty pageants or bodybuilding contests, and glamour photography and magazines like the annual Sports Illustrated Swimsuit Issue featuring models and sports personalities in swimsuits.

There is a very wide range of styles of modern swimsuits available, which vary as to body coverage and materials. The choice of style may depend on community standards of modesty, as well as current fashions, and personal preferences. The choice will also consider the occasion, for example whether it is to be worn for a passive occasion such as sunbathing or for an activity such as surfing or swimsuit competition. Swimwear universally covers at least the wearer's crotch area. For males, swimwear today usually leaves the upper body uncovered, while swimsuits for females usually cover at least the nipples, except in the case of a topless swimsuit.

Materials
Prior to the 1930s, swimsuits were typically made of wool, however such suits did not hug the body and became heavy with water.

Rayon began to be used in the 1920s in the manufacture of tight-fitting swimsuits, but its durability, especially when wet, proved problematic, with jersey and silk also sometimes being used.

In the 1930s, new materials were being developed and used in swimwear, particularly latex and nylon, and swimsuits gradually began hugging the body, especially women's swimsuits.

In the 1960s, spandex (Lycra) began to be used in swimsuits, usually combined with nylon, to make them fit snugly to the body. However, spandex is not particularly strong or durable, especially in chlorinated water in swimming pools and hot tubs.

Polyester is becoming more common as a durable, lightweight fabric for swimsuits, although it is not as stretchy as spandex.

Some companies have started to focus on recycled materials for their swimwear. They are working with companies that transform fishnets, nylon waste, and recovered plastic from shorelines, waterways and coastal communities into textile components.

Swimsuit styles
In Western culture, men's swimsuit styles include boardshorts, jammers, swim trunks, briefs AKA "speedos", thongs, and g-strings, in order of decreasing lower body coverage, and women's swimsuits include one-piece, bikinis, or thongs. While they go through many trends in pattern, length, and cut, there is not much modification to the original variety of suit. A recent innovation is the burqini, favored by some Muslim women, which covers the whole body and head (but not face) in a manner similar to a diver's wetsuit. These are an updated version of full-body swimwear, which has been available for centuries, but conforms with Islam's traditional emphasis on modest dress. In Egypt, the term "Sharia swimsuit" is used to describe full-body swimwear.

Unisex styles

Women's swimsuits

Men's swimsuits

Body coverage
Swimsuits can be skin-tight or loose-fitting. They are often lined with another layer of fabric if the outer fabric becomes transparent when wet.

Swimsuits range from designs that almost completely cover the body to designs that expose almost all of the body. The choice of swimsuit primarily depends on the activity of the wearer, from tight briefs for men for competitive diving and water polo to boardshorts for surfing; although ironically female competitive divers usually wear full one-piece suits while female competitive surfers often wear bikinis. Secondary considerations are personal and community standards of modesty depending on the location and social setting, how much sun protection is desired, and prevailing fashions. Almost all swimsuits cover the genitals and pubic hair, while most except thongs or g-strings (also called Brazilians) cover much or all of the buttocks.

Most swimsuits in western culture leave at least the head, shoulders, arms, and lower part of the leg (below the knee) exposed. Women's swimsuits generally cover at least the areola and bottom half of the breasts.
 
Both men and women may sometimes wear swimsuits covering more of the body when swimming in cold water (see also wetsuit and dry suit). In colder temperatures, swimsuits are needed to conserve body heat and protect the body core from hypothermia.

Competitive swimwear

Swimwear and hygiene
Germs, bacteria, and mold can grow very quickly on wet bathing suits. Medical professionals warn that wearing damp swimwear for long periods of time can cause a number of infections and rashes in children and adults, and warn against sharing bathing suits with others. They suggest that changing out of a wet bathing suit right away can help prevent vaginal infections, itching and/or jock itch.

In public swimming pools in France for reasons of hygiene, it is only permitted to wear closer fitting styles of swimwear. Men, for instance,  must wear "Speedo"-style bathing suits and not baggy shorts or trunks.

History

Pre-20th century

In classical antiquity swimming and bathing were done naked. There are Roman murals which show women playing sports and exercising wearing two-piece suits covering the areas around their breasts and hips in a fashion remarkably similar to the present-day bikini. However, there is no evidence that they were used for swimming. All classical pictures of swimming show nude swimmers.

In various cultural traditions one swims, if not in the nude, in a version in suitable material of a garment or undergarment commonly worn on land, e.g. a loincloth such as the Japanese man's .

In the United Kingdom, until the mid-19th century there was no law against nude swimming, and each town was free to make its own laws. For example, the Bath Corporation official bathing dress code of 1737 prescribed, for men:

It is Ordered Established and Decreed by this Corporation that no Male person above the age of ten years shall at any time hereafter go into any Bath or Baths within this City by day or by night without a Pair of Drawers and a Waistcoat on their bodies.

In rivers, lakes, streams and the sea, men swam in the nude, where the practice was common. Those who did not swim in the nude stripped to their underwear. The English practice of men swimming in the nude was banned in the United Kingdom in 1860. Drawers, or caleçons as they were called, came into use in the 1860s. Even then there were many who protested against them and wanted to remain in the nude. Francis Kilvert described men's bathing suits coming into use in the 1870s as "a pair of very short red and white striped drawers".

Female bathing costumes were derived from those worn at Bath and other spas. It would appear that until the 1670s, nude female bathing in the spas was the norm, and that after that time women bathed clothed. Celia Fiennes gave a detailed description of the standard ladies' bathing costume in 1687:

The Ladyes go into the bath with Garments made of a fine yellow canvas, which is stiff and made large with great sleeves like a parson's gown; the water fills it up so that it is borne off that your shape is not seen, it does not cling close as other linning, which Lookes sadly in the poorer sort that go in their own linning. The Gentlemen have drawers and wastcoates of the same sort of canvas, this is the best linning, for the bath water will Change any other yellow.

The Bath Corporation official bathing dress code of 1737 prescribed, for women:

No Female person shall at any time hereafter go into a Bath or Baths within this City by day or by night without a decent Shift on their bodies.

The Expedition of Humphry Clinker was published in 1771 and its description of ladies' bathing costume is different from that of Celia Fiennes a hundred years earlier:

The ladies wear jackets and petticoats of brown linen, with chip hats, in which they fix their handkerchiefs to wipe the sweat from their faces; but, truly, whether it is owing to the steam that surrounds them, or the heat of the water, or the nature of the dress, or to all these causes together, they look so flushed, and so frightful, that I always turn my eyes another way.

Penelope Byrde points out that Smollett's description may not be accurate, for he describes a two-piece costume, not the one piece shift or smock that most people describe and is depicted in contemporary prints. His description does, however, tally with Elizabeth Grant's description of the guide's costume at Ramsgate in 1811. The only difference is in the fabric the costumes are made of. Flannel, however, was a common fabric for sea bathing costumes as many believed the warmer fabric was necessary in cold water.

In the 18th century women wore "bathing gowns" in the water; these were long dresses of fabrics that would not become transparent when wet, with weights sewn into the hems so that they would not rise up in the water. The men's swim suit, a rather form-fitting wool garment with long sleeves and legs similar to long underwear, was developed and would change little for a century.

In the 19th century, the woman's double suit was common, comprising a gown from shoulder to knees plus a set of trousers with leggings going down to the ankles.

In the Victorian era, popular beach resorts were commonly equipped with bathing machines designed to avoid the exposure of people in swimsuits, especially to people of the opposite sex.

In the United States, beauty pageants of women in bathing costumes became popular from the 1880s. However, such events were not regarded as respectable. Beauty contests became more respectable with the first modern "Miss America" contest held in 1921, though less respectable beauty contests continued to be held.

20th century

The 1907 Sydney bathing costume protests were carried out in Australia after an ordinance was proposed that would have required males to wear a skirt-like tunic. In 1935, a similar ordinance was proposed, requiring males to wear the Spooner bathing costume instead of the 'disgraceful' swim trunks.

In 1907, the swimmer Annette Kellerman from Australia visited the United States as an "underwater ballerina", a version of synchronized swimming involving diving into glass tanks. She was arrested for indecent exposure because her swimsuit showed arms, legs and the neck. Kellerman changed the suit to have long arms and legs and a collar, still keeping the close fit that revealed the shapes underneath. She later starred in several movies, including one about her life. She marketed a line of bathing suits and her style of one-piece suits came to be known as "the Annette Kellerman". The Annette Kellerman was considered the most offensive style of swimsuit in the 1920s and became the focus of censorship efforts.

Despite opposition from some groups, the form-fitting style proved popular. It was not long before swimwear started to shrink further. At first arms were exposed and then legs up to mid-thigh. Necklines receded from around the neck down to around the top of the bosom. The development of new fabrics allowed for new varieties of more comfortable and practical swimwear.

Due to the figure-hugging nature of these garments, glamour photography since the 1940s and 1950s has often featured people wearing swimsuits. This type of glamour photography eventually evolved into swimsuit photography exemplified by the annual Sports Illustrated Swimsuit Issue. Beauty contests also required contestants to wear form-fitting swimsuits.

The first bikinis appeared just after World War II. Early examples were not very different from the women's two pieces common since the 1920s, except that they had a gap below the breast line allowing for a section of bare midriff. They were named after Bikini Atoll, the site of several nuclear weapons tests, for their supposed explosive effect on the viewer.

Through the 1950s, it was thought proper for the lower part of the bikini to come up high enough to cover the navel. From the 1960s on, the bikini shrank in all directions until it sometimes covered little more than the nipples and genitalia, although less revealing models giving more support to the breasts remained popular. At the same time, fashion designer Rudi Gernreich introduced the monokini, a topless suit for women consisting of a modest bottom supported by two thin straps. Although not a commercial success, the suit opened eyes to new design possibilities. In the 1980s the thong or "tanga" came out of Brazil, said to have been inspired by traditional garments of native tribes in the Amazon. However, the one-piece suit continued to be popular for its more modest approach.

Men's swimsuits developed roughly in parallel to women's during this period, with the shorts covering progressively less. Eventually racing-style "speedo" suits became popular—and not just for their speed advantages. Thong, g-string and bikini style suits are also worn. Typically these are more popular in more tropical regions; however, they may also be worn at public swimming pools and inland lakes. But in the 1990s, longer and baggier shorts became popular, with the hems often reaching to the knees. Often called boardshorts and swim trunks, these were often worn lower on the hips than regular shorts.

Alternatives to swimsuits
Since the early twentieth century a naturist movement has developed in western countries that seeks to enjoy non-sexual nakedness when swimming and during other activities. Some women prefer to engage in water or sun activities with their torso uncovered. The practice is often described as "toplessness" or "topfreedom".  In some places around the world, nude beaches have been set aside for people who choose to engage in beach activities in the nude.

As an alternative to a swimsuit, some people wear trousers, underpants, or a T-shirt either as a makeshift swimsuit or because they prefer regular clothes over swimsuits. Using a T-shirt can also provide extra protection against sunburn. This practice may be more accepted at beaches than at swimming pools, which tend not to permit the use of regular clothes as swimwear  because regular clothes are unlined, may become translucent, and may be perceived as unclean.

Swimsuit outside the water
Swimsuits can also be worn outside the water, for example as a fashion item, for sports or while sunbathing.

See also
1907 Sydney bathing costume protests
Bikini in popular culture
List of swimwear brands
Women's beachwear fashion

References

External links 

17th-century fashion
18th-century fashion
19th-century fashion
20th-century fashion
History of clothing (Western fashion)
History of fashion
 
Sportswear
Swimming equipment